Ádhamh Ó Cuirnín was an Irish medieval scribe from a north Connacht bardic family.  His place in history remains as that of the copier, in 1418, of Lebor Gabála Érenn [The Book of the Taking of Ireland], an important historic record of the land's folkloric history, compiled and edited by an anonymous scholar in the 11th century, and containing a loose collection of poems and prose narratives recounting the mythical origins and history of the Irish race from the creation of the world to the Middle Ages.

References
Welsh, Robert (1996). Oxford Concise Companion to Irish Literature. 

Medieval Gaels from Ireland
15th-century Irish people
Irish chroniclers
Medieval European scribes
Irish scribes
15th-century Irish writers
Irish-language writers
14th-century births
15th-century deaths
Year of birth unknown
Year of death unknown
Place of death unknown